Pejvakin is a protein that in humans is encoded by the PJVK gene.

Function

The protein encoded by this gene is a member of the gasdermin family, a family which is found only in vertebrates. The encoded protein is required for the proper function of auditory pathway neurons. Defects in this gene are a cause of non-syndromic sensorineural deafness autosomal recessive type 59 (DFNB59). [provided by RefSeq, Dec 2008].

References

Further reading